Taylor Branch is a stream in St. Francois and Ste. Genevieve Counties in the U.S. state of Missouri. It is a tributary of Wolf Creek.

A variant name was "Taylor Creek". Taylor Branch has the name of George Taylor, a pioneer settler.

See also
List of rivers of Missouri

References

Rivers of St. Francois County, Missouri
Rivers of Ste. Genevieve County, Missouri
Rivers of Missouri